Dromid Pearses is a Gaelic Athletic Association club from Dromid Parish, South Kerry in County Kerry, Ireland.

History
Dromid Pearses was founded in 1946 by Sean Hard Curran.
They have a football field at Inchanatina, Mastergeehy with dressing rooms that was officially opened on 20 October 1991.

The club have built a stand which holds 300 people, two new dug outs, floodlights, new goalposts and new netting and a new scoreboard. Construction has started on a new building which will consist of new dressing rooms.

Achievements
 Munster Junior Club Football Championship Winners (1) 2011
 Kerry Junior Football Championship Winners (2) 2011 2017 Runners-Up 2001, 2010, 2014
 Kerry Novice Football Championship Winners (1) 1999  Runner-Up 1998
 South Kerry Senior Football Championship Winners (3) 2004 2019, 2022 - Runners-Up 2005, 2011, 2013, 2017, 2018, 2020 , 2021

Women's team
In 2009, Dromid Pearses formed a women's team. Players from all over South Kerry joined up to play and the club were very competitive for several years. However with the popularity of the Southern Gaels Ladies team, Dromid Pearses Ladies found it difficult to field a team and ceased playing in 2015

Notable players

All-Ireland winners
SFC

 Declan O'Sullivan (5): 2004, 2006 (c), 2007 (c), 2009, 2014
 Graham O'Sullivan (1): 2022

JFC

 Niall O'Shea (2): 2012, 2016
 Denis Shine O'Sullivan (1): 2006

U21FC

 Aidan Shine O'Sullivan (1): 2008

MFC

 Graham O'Sullivan (2): 2015, 2016

Hogan Cup

 Dominic O'Sullivan (1): 2009
 Niall O'Shea (1): 2009

National Football League
National Football League Division 1

 Declan O'Sullivan (3): 2004, 2006 (c), 2009

All Stars
 Declan O'Sullivan (3): 2007, 2008 2009

Others
 Aidan O'Sullivan
 Jack O'Connor

References

Gaelic games clubs in County Kerry
Gaelic football clubs in County Kerry